André Moes (2 March 1930 – 13 November 2019) was a Luxembourgian cyclist. He competed in the individual and team road race events at the 1952 Summer Olympics.

References

External links
 

1930 births
2019 deaths
Luxembourgian male cyclists
Olympic cyclists of Luxembourg
Cyclists at the 1952 Summer Olympics
Place of birth missing